Francavilla may refer to:

People
Pietro Francavilla (1548–1615), Franco-Flemish sculptor
Francesco Francavilla, Italian comic book artist
Costanza d'Avalos, Duchess of Francavilla (1460–1541), noblewoman of Spanish origin

Places in Italy
Francavilla al Mare, a municipality of the Province of Chieti, Abruzzo
Francavilla Angitola, a municipality of the Province of Vibo Valentia, Calabria
Francavilla Bisio, a municipality of the Province of Alessandria, Piedmont
Francavilla d'Ete, a municipality of the Province of Fermo, Marche
Francavilla di Sicilia, a municipality of the Province of Messina, Sicily
Francavilla Fontana, a municipality of the Province of Brindisi, Apulia
Francavilla in Sinni, a municipality of the Province of Potenza, Basilicata
Francavilla Marittima, a municipality of the Province of Cosenza, Calabria

Other uses
Francavilla Calcio (disambiguation), several football clubs
Francavilla (grape), an Italian wine grape used to blend the Ostuni DOC

See also
Villafranca, a municipality of Navarre, Spain
Villafranca (disambiguation)